1973 college football season may refer to:

 1973 NCAA Division I football season
 1973 NCAA Division II football season
 1973 NCAA Division III football season
 1973 NAIA Division I football season
 1973 NAIA Division II football season